The Franklin Academy & Prattsburgh Central School (PCS) is a school located in Prattsburgh, New York for grades pre-K–12.

Public elementary schools in New York (state)
Public high schools in New York (state)
Public middle schools in New York (state)
Schools in Steuben County, New York